Alfred Wurzbach Ritter von Tannenberg (born 22 July 1846 in Lemberg; died 18 May 1915 in Vienna) was an Austrian art critic.

Biography
He was the son of Constantin von Wurzbach. He studied jurisprudence in Vienna and entered the civil service, but resigned in 1876 and devoted himself entirely to the study of art history. He was art critic for the Wiener Allgemeine Zeitung from 1881 to 1886.

Works
Under the title Zeitgenossen he published a series of biographical sketches (1871–72), and afterwards the monograph Martin Schongauer (1881), a Geschichte der holländischen Malerei (History of Dutch painting, 1885), besides biographies of Dutch and Flemish painters in Dohme's Kunst und Künstler (Art and artists, 1876). He also edited dictionaries of artist biographies, and compiled Rembrandt-Galerie (1885), and translated Houbraken's The Great Theatre of Dutch Painters (original Dutch edition 1718).

 Laura: Eine Novelle in Versen, 1873
 Die französischen Maler des 18. Jahrhunderts (French painters of the 18th century), 1879
 Grosse Schouburgh der niederländischen Maler und Malerinnen, 1879
 Die goldene Bibel (The golden Bible), 1880
 Rembrandt-Galerie: Eine Auswahl von hundert Gemälden, 1886
 Niederländisches Künstler-Lexikon, 3 Volumes, 1911

Notes

References
 

1846 births
1915 deaths
Austrian critics
Austrian art historians
Austrian biographers
Male biographers
Austrian knights
Writers from Vienna